Mary Stopford, Countess of Courtown (21 May 1769 – 21 (or 14) April 1823), formerly Lady Mary Scott, was the wife of James Stopford, 3rd Earl of Courtown, and the mother of the 4th Earl.

Lady Mary was the daughter of Henry Scott, 3rd Duke of Buccleuch, and his wife, the former Lady Elizabeth Montagu. Lady Mary married the future earl, then known as Lord Courtown and an MP,  on 29 January 1791 at St George's, Hanover Square, London. A few years later, his father-in-law, the Duke of Buccleuch, arranged for Stopford to become MP for Linlithgow Burghs, even though he was by this time a viscount, his father having inherited the earldom in 1788.

Their children were:

Lady Jane Stopford (died 1873), who married the Reverend Abel John Ram and had children
Venerable Hon. Henry Scott Stopford (died 1881), Archdeacon of Leighlin, who married Annette Browne
George Henry James Stopford (c.1791-1792), who died in infancy
Charles Stopford (c.1792-1794), who died in infancy
James Thomas Stopford, 4th Earl of Courtown (1794-1858), who married twice: first, to Lady Charlotte Albina Montagu-Scott, and second, to Dora Pennefather; he had children from both marriages.
Lt.-Col. Hon. Edward Stopford (1795-1840), who married Horatia Charlotte Lockwood and had children
Vice-Admiral Hon. Sir Montagu Stopford (1798-1864), who married twice: first, to Cordelia Winifreda Whitmore, and second, to Lucy Cay; he had children from both marriages.

When his father died in 1810, Stopford inherited the earldom and his wife became a countess. Her portrait was painted by George Romney, who recorded sittings for the portrait in 1793. The portrait emphasises the subject's height and the slenderness of her waist.

The countess predeceased her husband, dying at the family seat, Courtown House, Gorey, County Wexford, Ireland. The house was demolished in 1962. She was buried in the cemetery at Courtown.

References

1769 births
1823 deaths
Irish countesses
Daughters of British dukes